The 2016–17 Santa Clara Broncos men's basketball team represented Santa Clara University during the 2016–17 NCAA Division I men's basketball season. This was head coach Herb Sendek's first season at Santa Clara. The Broncos played their home games at the Leavey Center as members of the West Coast Conference. They finished the season 17–16, 10–8 in WCC play to finish in a tie for fourth place. They defeated San Francisco in the WCC tournament before losing in the semifinals to Gonzaga.

Previous season
The Broncos finished the 2015–16 season 11–20, 7–11 in WCC play to finish in sixth place. They lost in the quarterfinals of the WCC tournament to BYU.

On March 7, 2016, head coach Kerry Keating was fired by Santa Clara. On March 29, the school hired Herb Sendek as head coach.

Departures

Incoming Transfers

Recruiting

Roster

Schedule and results

|-
!colspan=9 style=| Exhibition

|-
!colspan=9 style=| Non-conference regular season

  

|-
!colspan=9 style=| WCC regular season

|-
!colspan=9 style=| WCC tournament

References

Santa Clara Broncos men's basketball seasons
Santa Clara
Santa Clara
Santa Clara